Blossom Time is a 1940 Swedish drama film directed by Alf Sjöberg and starring Sture Lagerwall, Gerd Hagman and Arnold Sjöstrand. It was shot at the Sundbyberg Studios of Europafilm in Stockholm with location shooting on Ornö. The film's sets were designed by the art director Max Linder.

Cast
 Sture Lagerwall as Allan Olsson
 Gerd Hagman as Eva Andersson, teacher
 Arnold Sjöstrand as Fritiof
 Ragnar Falck as Plutten
 Carl Barcklind as Lövström
 Holger Löwenadler as Lundgren
 Hedvig Lindby as Fritiof's Mother
 Hilding Gavle as Priest
 Ernst Brunman as Shopkeeper
 Barbro Flodquist as Girl
 Valborg Svensson as Ida

References

Bibliography
 Qvist, Per Olov & von Bagh, Peter. Guide to the Cinema of Sweden and Finland. Greenwood Publishing Group, 2000.
 Wakeman, John. World Film Directors: 1890-1945. H.W. Wilson, 1987.

External links
 
 

1940 films
1940s Swedish-language films
1940 drama films
Swedish black-and-white films
Films directed by Alf Sjöberg
Swedish drama films
1940s Swedish films